Willian Prado Camargo (born 22 January 1995), known as Willian Formiga, is a Brazilian football player who plays as a left back for Ceará.

Club career
He made his professional debut in the Segunda Liga for Vitória Guimarães B on 10 December 2016 in a game against Braga B.

References

External links

1995 births
Sportspeople from Florianópolis
Living people
Brazilian footballers
Brazilian expatriate footballers
Cianorte Futebol Clube players
Brusque Futebol Clube players
Vitória S.C. B players
Grêmio Esportivo Brasil players
Grêmio Novorizontino players
Vila Nova Futebol Clube players
Ceará Sporting Club players
Campeonato Brasileiro Série B players
Campeonato Brasileiro Série D players
Liga Portugal 2 players
Association football defenders
Brazilian expatriate sportspeople in Portugal
Expatriate footballers in Portugal